2003 Academy Awards may refer to:

 75th Academy Awards, the Academy Awards ceremony that took place in 2003
 76th Academy Awards, the 2004 ceremony honoring the best in film for 2003